The Journal of Neurosurgery is a monthly peer-reviewed medical journal covering all aspects of neurosurgery. It is published by the American Association of Neurological Surgeons and the editor-in-chief is James Rutka. It was established in 1944, with Louise Eisenhardt as founding editor. Originally published bimonthly, it switched to a monthly schedule in 1962. All content is freely available online after 12 months, until it is 10 years old. According to the Journal Citation Reports, the journal has a 2021 impact factor of x.xxx.

Editors-in-chief
The following persons are or have been editors-in-chief of the journal:
James Rutka (2013–present)
John A. Jane (1992–2013)
Thoralf Sundt, Jr. (1989–1992)
William Collins Jr. (1985–1989)
Henry Schwartz (1975–1985)
Henry Heyl (1965–1975)
Louise Eisenhardt (1944–1965)

The Journal of Neurosurgery Publishing Group
The Journal of Neurosurgery Publishing Group also publishes:
Journal of Neurosurgery: Spine, established in 1999, it is an independent journal since 2004
Journal of Neurosurgery: Pediatrics, established in 2004, it is an independent journal since January 2008
Neurosurgical Focus, published monthly since 1996, it is curated by expert guest editors and is free to the public

References

Further reading
Jane Sr JA. "History of the Journal of Neurosurgery," in History of the American Association of Neurological Surgeons. Virginia Beach, VA: The Donning Company Publishers, 2007, pp 58–63 
Rutka, James T. "Editorial: Leading transition while maintaining tradition". J Neurosurg 2013, June 4

External links

Publications established in 1944
Neurosurgery journals
Monthly journals

English-language journals